China Girl may refer to:

Music
"China Girl" (song), a 1977 song by David Bowie and Iggy Pop, rerecorded and released as a single by Bowie in 1983
"China Girl", a song by John Cougar, released in 1982 on the album American Fool
"China Girl", a song by the group The 411 from their album Between the Sheets
"China Girl", a single by Afric Simone

Other uses
China girl (filmmaking), an image appearing in reel leaders to assist with color calibration
China Girl (1942 film), starring Gene Tierney and George Montgomery
China Girl (1987 film), a 1987 film directed by Abel Ferrara
China Girl (manga), a manga serialised in Big Comic
Top of the Lake: China Girl, the second season of the Australian-New Zealand series Top of the Lake